The American Legion Post No. 121 is a historic social hall on Legion Hut Road in southern Paris, Arkansas.  It is a single-story L-shaped structure, built out of notched logs on a stone foundation.  The logs are painted brown, and are mortared with white cement. It has a gabled roof with exposed rafter ends.  A gabled porch shelters the front entrance, supported by square posts set on concrete piers faced in stone.  The building was constructed in 1934 with work crews funded by the Works Progress Administration, and is the best local example of WPA Rustic architecture.

The building was listed on the National Register of Historic Places in 1995.

See also
National Register of Historic Places listings in Logan County, Arkansas

References

American Legion buildings
Cultural infrastructure completed in 1934
Buildings and structures in Paris, Arkansas
WPA Rustic architecture
Clubhouses on the National Register of Historic Places in Arkansas
National Register of Historic Places in Logan County, Arkansas
1934 establishments in Arkansas